Eki Febri Ekawati (born 18 February 1992) is an Indonesian athlete. She won bronze medal in shot put event in 2021 Islamic Solidarity Games.

Career 
Eki Febri Ekawati gained her first international experience at the Southeast Asian Games 2011 in Palembang, where she finished sixth with 13.08m. In 2013 she won the gold medal in the javelin throw at the Islamic Solidarity Games with 34.37 m and silver with the ball with 14.00 m behind the Iranian Leila Rajabi . Later in 2017, she won the gold medal at the Southeast Asian Games in Kuala Lumpur with 15.39m. In 2018, she finished seventh at the Asian Games in Jakarta with 14.61m. The following year, she also finished seventh at the Asian Championships in Doha with 14.94m and in December she won the Southeast Asian Games in Capas with 15.08m the silver medal behind the Thai Areerat Intadis. In 2021 she improved the national record to 15.77m and the following year she won the Southeast Asian Games in Hanoi with 15.20m.

Ekawati was Indonesia's shot put champion in 2013, 2017 and 2019.

References

External links

1992 births
Living people
People from Kuningan
Indonesian female sprinters
Southeast Asian Games medalists in athletics
Southeast Asian Games gold medalists for Indonesia
Competitors at the 2021 Southeast Asian Games
Athletes (track and field) at the 2018 Asian Games
Islamic Solidarity Games medalists in athletics
21st-century Indonesian women